George Lawson Wrenn (July 2, 1875 – July 29, 1948) was an American tennis player active in the late 19th century and early 20th century.

Tennis career
Wrenn reached the all-comers final of the U.S. National Championships in 1900 (beating his brother Robert and Arthur Gore before losing to William Larned) and the quarterfinals in 1896 and 1899.

References

1948 deaths
American male tennis players
1875 births
Tennis people from Illinois